Shapleigh is a town in Maine.

Shapleigh may also refer to:

Augustus Shapleigh (1810-1902), American businessman
Bertram Shapleigh (1871–1940), American composer
Eliot Shapleigh (born 1952), American politician
John Shapleigh (disambiguation)